John James Willan (1799 – 15 September 1869) was an English amateur cricketer who played first-class cricket from 1819 to 1830.  He was mainly associated with Hampshire and with Marylebone Cricket Club (MCC), of which he was a member.  He made 13 known appearances in first-class matches.

Willan was educated at Eton before being admitted to St John's College, Cambridge in 1817. Although he apparently only kept two terms at the university, he played for Cambridge University Cricket Club in its inaugural first-class match in 1819.

References

1799 births
1869 deaths
English cricketers
English cricketers of 1787 to 1825
English cricketers of 1826 to 1863
Hampshire cricketers
Marylebone Cricket Club cricketers
Cambridge University cricketers
People educated at Eton College
Alumni of St John's College, Cambridge
Gentlemen cricketers
Marylebone Cricket Club First 8 with 3 Others cricketers